East Island is an island in the Mary Anne Group, located at 21º16'S 115º35'E off the northwest coast of Western Australia.

References

 Mary Anne Group